Sergey Pavlovich Karpov (born 1948) is a leading Russian Byzantinist who specializes in the Empire of Trebizond and the history of Gazaria.  His work in Italian archives helped bring to light the records of Genoese and Venetian notaries and accountants concerning their Black Sea colonies. Some of his monographs are available in Italian translation. He was awarded a State Prize in 1996 and was elected into the Russian Academy of Sciences in 2003. Karpov was Dean of the Department of History of the Moscow State University from 1995 until 2015.

Monographs 
 Sergei Karpov. Трапезундская империя и западноевропейские государства, 1204-1461. ("The Empire of Trebizond and the nations of Western Europe, 1204–1461.") Moscow, 1981, 231 pp.
 L' impero di Trebisonda, Venezia, Genova e Roma, 1204-1461. Rapporti politici, diplomatici e commerciali. Roma, 1986. 321 pp.
 La Navigazione Veneziana nel Mar Nero XIII-XV sec. Ravenna, 2000. 207 pp.
 Sergei Karpov. История Трапезундской империи ("A history of the empire of Trebizond"). Saint Petersburg, 2007, 656 pp.

Articles

References

External links 
List of publications at istina.msu.ru MSU Istina Research Impact Intelligent Measurement System
  List of publications up to January 2010
Sergey Karpov's profile and works on Academia.edu

Russian Byzantinists
Russian medievalists
People from Stavropol
Academic staff of Moscow State University
Corresponding Members of the Russian Academy of Sciences
1948 births
Living people
20th-century Russian historians
21st-century Russian historians

Scholars of Byzantine history